Rowing competitions at the 2022 Bolivarian Games in Valledupar, Colombia were held from 25 to 27 June 2022 at Ciénaga de Zapatosa in Chimichagua, a sub-venue outside Valledupar.

Twelve medal events were scheduled to be contested, six for each men and women. The rowing competitions included the following sculling events for both men and women: singles, lightweight singles, doubles, lightweight doubles, quads and lightweight quads. A total of 74 athletes (40 men and 34 women) will compete in the events. The events were open competitions without age restrictions.

Chile, who were the competition defending champions after Santa Marta 2017, won the rowing competitions again after winning 6 of the 12 gold medals at stake.

Participating nations
A total of 7 nations (4 ODEBO nations and 3 invited) registered athletes for the rowing competitions. Each nation was able to enter one boat per event and a maximum of 16 athletes (8 per gender). The participation of athletes from Ecuador was expected, but finally they were not registered.

Venue
The rowing competitions were held at the Ciénaga de Zapatosa, a large marsh located in a depression between the Colombian departments of Cesar and Magdalena. The events took place in the part of the marsh corresponding to the municipality of Chimichagua.

Medal summary

Medal table

Medalists

Men's events

Women's events

Mixed quadruple sculls (exhibition event)
In addition, a mixed quadruple sculls event was held but did not add any medals to the rowing medal table.

References

External links
Bolivarianos Valledupar 2022 Rowing

2022 in rowing
2022 Bolivarian Games